The politics of Rhône-Alpes, France takes place in a framework of a presidential representative democracy, whereby the President of Regional Council is the head of government, and of a pluriform multi-party system. Legislative power is vested in the regional council.

Executive
The executive of the region is led by the President of the regional council.

List of presidents

Legislative branch

The Regional Council of Rhône-Alpes (Conseil régional de Rhône-Alpes) is composed of 157 councillors, elected by proportional representation in a two-round system. The winning list in the second round is automatically entitled to a quarter of the seats. The remainder of the seats are allocated through proportional representation with a 5% threshold.

The Council is elected for a six-year term.

Current composition
.

Elections

Other elections
In the 2007 legislative election, the UMP won 32 seats, while the opposition PS won 14. The New Centre won one seat, as did the Communist Party. A right-wing independent won one seat in Haute-Savoie.

References

External links
Rhône-Alpes Region